In Asia, Google Street View is available in Bangladesh, Bhutan, Cambodia, Hong Kong, Indonesia, Israel, India, Japan, Kyrgyzstan, Macau, Malaysia, Mongolia, the Philippines, Qatar, Russia, Singapore, South Korea, Sri Lanka, Taiwan, Thailand, Turkey, and Vietnam. It is also available for a few select tourist attractions in the People's Republic of China and Pakistan.

Timeline of introductions 

Service in Japan was introduced on August 4, 2008. Japan's coverage was initially concentrated in five areas with a total of 10 camera icons. The service has faced criticisms from bloggers in Japan of cultural insensitivity.

On May 26, 2011, Google announced that, in India, capturing of Street View images in Bangalore, the capital of the state of Karnataka, had started. However, Google Street View was banned from Bangalore on June 20, 2011.

On September 2, 2011, Google has revealed that its Street View feature will be introduced to the country in association with the Tourism Authority of Thailand.

On September 3, 2011, Google started to collaborate with Tourism Malaysia to record Malaysian locations to be featured on its Google Map Street View.

On January 24, 2012, Google Street View was launched in South Korea starting with imagery from the country's capital, Seoul, as well as South Korea's second largest city, Busan.

Google Street View in Jordan was launched in November 2015 which included 43 archaeological sites. On the announcement day, Queen Rania wrote on the announcement and praised tourism enhancing efforts in Jordan.

Since March 2022 a large amount of Street view, taken by Google since November 2021, has been added in Bangladesh. This coverage covers mostly agricultural areas of Dhaka Division, and as of April 2022 it continues to expand every few days.

In July 27, 2022 Google added street view coverage in ten major cities of India and its surroundings, ending thus the 11-year-old ban on Google Street View. The footage is shot from Tech Mahindra and Genesys companies and licensed to Google. There is planning for a rollout of the service in national level, and there are daily additions of Indian roads into the platform.

Areas included 
Reference:







There also are some selected attractions and museums in Beijing (Forbidden City), in Wuhan, Yangzhou, Hangzhou and Suzhou.





For security reasons, the Government of India had prohibited Street View photography until 2022. In July, 2022 Google launched Street View service in 10 major Indian cities and plans to expand all over India. Now it has street view in New Delhi, Mumbai, Bangalore, Chennai, Kolkata and many other cities.

Google Street View Covers most regencies and cities in Sumatra (except Aceh), Java, Lesser Sunda Islands, Borneo, Sulawesi.

In October 2019, Google excluded and removed most of the Street View images of Aceh due to a controversial incident. The Aceh City Government considered suing Google about why the inappropriate image can be easily passed and shown to public. Even so, the government still allows Street View recordings in certain places that are not in roadways. The City Government also reported this incident to Ministry of Communication and Information Technology.





Full Coverage



Landmarks: State History Museum,Gumbez of Manas



















For European Russia, see Google Street View in Europe



Landmarks: Gyeongbokgung Palace , Changdeokgung Palace  , Jongmyo Shrine .  National Museum of Korea , National Palace Museum of Korea , National Folk Museum of Korea ,  Seoul City Hall  , National Theater of Korea , Dongdaemun Design Plaza , Deoksugung Palace ,  Gyeonghuigung Palace , Deoksugung National Museum of Art , Paichae Hakdang History Museum , Cheonggye Square , Insadong Ssamzigil , Starfield COEX Mall , Gangneung Ice Arena , Gangneung Oval . Gangneung Hockey Centre , Kwandong Hockey Centre



Full Coverage













Controversy 
As in other places, there has been controversy surrounding plans to bring Street View to various Asian countries.

In Israel, there have been concerns that introducing the service could increase the risk of terrorism to which the region is prone.

In India, the Government had rejected Google Street View until June 2022. But in June 2022 the Indian Government allowed street view in many cities of India including the capital city New Delhi. Now it is available in Mumbai, Bangaluru, Chennai and many others . Security establishments became wary of allowing such image capturing given that planning for the 2008 terrorist attacks in Mumbai is believed to have involved photographic reconnaissance of targets by Pakistani American David Coleman Headley. The Indian Government had plans to talk about Google street view in India, but in March 2018 Government of India finally rejected the Google Street view plan citing that this will compromise the country's security. However, many users have uploaded an increasing amount of Street view in various parts of India, such as Bengaluru and Kerala, among many others. Finally in July 2022 Government of India allowed Google to launch Street View services across the county.

Google had to reshoot all images in Japan because the camera cars that took the original photographs were originally too high, leading to privacy concerns. Japanese houses are generally built quite close to the road. Roads are also narrow, often without pavements. Such factors led to privacy concerns with the original photographs.

Police in South Korea raided Google offices in that country in order to determine if Street View was legal.

In 2013, people in Tambon Sa-iap village, Song District in Phrae Province, Thailand, mistakenly believed that the Street View car was surveying the village for the unwanted Kaeng Suea Ten Dam project and blocked it, not allowing it to take photographs. They also arrested the driver and interrogated him to determine if he was working for the dam project. He was released after swearing on the Buddha that his work was not related to the dam project. After confirming his story, the village's leaders apologized for the misunderstanding.

In Indonesia, Google was forced by the Aceh City Government to remove almost every Street View image of Aceh in 2019, leaving exceptions to Langsa, Aceh Tamiang, Southeast Aceh, Aceh Singkil, and Subulussalam City (as well as Street View recordings of certain places that are not in roadways). This incident was caused by some foreigners that were uploading inappropriate images, some of which contain two naked foreigners. One of them wrote the sentence "Protest sharia law." on his hand. The city government discovered this and considered suing Google, as well as asking it why the inappropriate images could be so easily shown to the public. The City Government also reported this incident to Ministry of Communication and Information Technology. With this incident, the government continues to use this as the main reason for defending the Law of Information and Electronic Transactions Act.

References

External links 
 Article on 360 degree Dubai Google street view

Communications in Asia
Geography of Asia
Asia
Maps of Asia